The following are the football (soccer) events of the year 1944 throughout the world.

Winners club national championship 
 Argentina: Boca Juniors
 Austria: First Vienna
 Belgium: R. Antwerp F.C.
 Czechoslovakia: Sparta Prague
 Denmark: Boldklubben Frem
 Finland: VIFK Vaasa
 Germany: Dresdner SC
 Iceland: Valur
 Ireland: Shelbourne
 Israel: Hapoel Tel Aviv
 Italy: Spezia Calcio
 Mexico: Real Club España
 Portugal: Sporting Clube de Portugal
 Romania: Nagyváradi AC
 Peru: Sucre FC
 Scotland:
Scottish Cup: No competition
 Spain: Valencia CF
 Sweden: Malmö FF
 Switzerland: Lausanne Sports
 Turkey: Fenerbahçe

Births 
 March 15 – Gérard Farison, French international footballer (died 2021)
 April 4 – Ronnie Rees, Welsh international footballer
 April 15 – Kunishige Kamamoto, Japanese international footballer
 June 28 –  Georgi Hristakiev, Bulgarian international footballer (died 2016)
 July 7 – Jürgen Grabowski, German international footballer (died 2022)
 July 14 – Juan Carlos Touriño, Spanish international footballer (died 2017)
 July 17 – Carlos Alberto Torres, Brazilian international footballer (died 2016)
 August 23 – Augustin Deleanu, Romanian international footballer (died 2014)
 September 30 – Jimmy Johnstone, Scottish international footballer (died 2006)
 November 9 – Herbert Wimmer, German international footballer
 December 17 – Ferenc Bene, Hungarian international footballer (died 2006)
 December 25 – Jairzinho, Brazilian international footballer

Deaths
 April 11 – Alejandro Villanueva (35), Peruvian footballer (born 1908)
 July 18 – Wim Anderiesen (40), Dutch footballer (born 1903)

References

 
Association football by year